Lidia Ewa Staroń, née Kwiatkowska (born 7 June 1960 in Morąg) is a Polish politician. She was elected to the Sejm on 25 September 2005, getting 12,188 votes in 35 Olsztyn district as a candidate from the Civic Platform list. She left Civic Platform in 2015 and was an independent candidate for Senator in 2015 Parliamentary elections. She was elected Senator with 63,870 votes.

See also
Members of Polish Sejm 2005-2007

External links
- parliamentary page - includes declarations of interest, voting record, and transcripts of speeches.
Official page

1960 births
Living people
People from Morąg
Members of the Polish Sejm 2005–2007
Women members of the Sejm of the Republic of Poland
Women members of the Senate of Poland
Civic Platform politicians
21st-century Polish women politicians
Members of the Polish Sejm 2007–2011
Members of the Polish Sejm 2011–2015
Members of the Senate of Poland 2015–2019
Members of the Senate of Poland 2019–2023
University of Warmia and Mazury in Olsztyn alumni